Dunuthilaka Mudiyanselage Renuka Menike Herath, commonly known as Renuka Herath (Sinhala: රේණුකා හේරත්, Tamil language: ரேணுகா ஹேரத், Born 7 September 1945 – 13 March 2017), was a prominent Sri Lankan politician and a member of the Parliament of Sri Lanka. She was the Health Minister under President Ranasinghe Premadasa. Renuka Herath was the opposition leader of the Central Provincial Council when she died.

During her tenure as the Minister of Health, while there was a tremendous amount of improvement to the healthcare system, it was also a time where no strikes in the healthcare service sector were allowed to cause inconvenience the public. She was active in politics up until she died in 2017.

She is still known today as one of the most outspoken and courageous political leaders who fought for justice and rights of the people.

Career 
Renuka Herath was a member of the UNP and came into politics by contesting in 1977 from her native Walapane electorate in Nuwara-Eliya district. She went on to win her first election and became a district minister.

In 1988, she was appointed as the deputy minister of cultural affairs. During President Ranasinghe Premadasa’s regime, she was the Minister of Health and women’s affairs.  It was during her tenure in office that a major development in infrastructure and public service sector and uplift the quality of life for the people in Walapane and Nuwara-Eliya.

References

1945 births
2017 deaths
Members of the 8th Parliament of Sri Lanka
Members of the 9th Parliament of Sri Lanka
Members of the 10th Parliament of Sri Lanka
Members of the 13th Parliament of Sri Lanka
District ministers of Sri Lanka
Health ministers of Sri Lanka
Women legislators in Sri Lanka
Women government ministers of Sri Lanka
United National Party politicians
20th-century Sri Lankan women politicians
21st-century Sri Lankan women politicians